The 1998 Australian Individual Speedway Championship was held at the Riverview Speedway in Murray Bridge, South Australia on 14 February 1998.

Mildura rider Leigh Adams won his fourth Australian Championship after defeating Jason Lyons and Jason Crump in a runoff when all three riders tied on 13 points.

1998 Australian Solo Championship
 Australian Championship
 14 February 1998
  Murray Bridge, South Australia - Riverview Speedway
 Referee: 
 Qualification: The top three riders go through to the Overseas Final in Poole, England.

References

See also
 Australia national speedway team
 Sport in Australia

Speedway in Australia
Australia
Individual Speedway Championship